Kurt Meyer (born 16 September 1933) is a German former sports shooter. He competed in the 50 metre pistol event at the 1968 Summer Olympics for West Germany.

References

1933 births
Living people
German male sport shooters
Olympic shooters of West Germany
Shooters at the 1968 Summer Olympics
Sportspeople from Wuppertal